{{DISPLAYTITLE:C18H22ClNO3}}
The molecular formula C18H22ClNO3 (molar mass: 335.83 g/mol, exact mass: 335.1288 u) may refer to:

 25C-NB3OMe
 25C-NB4OMe
 25C-NBOMe